Wenshui Road is a station on Shanghai Metro Line 1.

References 

Shanghai Metro stations in Jing'an District
Railway stations in China opened in 2004
Line 1, Shanghai Metro
Railway stations in Shanghai